A Public Security Bureau (PSB) of a city or county, or Public Security Department (PSD) of a province or autonomous region, in the People's Republic of China refers to a government office essentially acting as a police station or a local or provincial police/sheriff; the smallest police stations are called police posts. The PSB/PSD system is similar in concept to the Japanese Kōban system, and is present in each province and municipality. Typically, a PSB/PSD handles policing, public security, and social order. Other duties include residence registration ("hukou") and internal and external migration matters, such as the registration of temporary residents (including both foreign and domestic visitors).

The system of public security bureaus is administered by the Ministry of Public Security (MPS), which co-ordinates the work of provincial public security departments that are also answerable to the local governments and provincial party secretaries. PSB's located in each province are jointly supervised by the central government as well as provincial governments, an arrangement that is supposedly supposed to prevent corruption and unchecked influence by provincial (The equivalent of state) general secretaries (The equivalent of state governors).  Provincial public security bureaus in turn administer county or district level public security sub-bureaus and branch bureaus, which perform a role similar to larger police stations. The lowest level outposts are police posts, which perform a role similar to small local police stations.

The network of public security bureaus and the Ministry of Public Security should not be confused with the separate but parallel network of state security bureaus/state  security departments, administered at the national level by the Ministry of State Security (MSS), which is responsible for external and internal intelligence, and performing a "secret police" or security police role responsible for pre-remptive response to 'mass incidents' (Chinese terminology for protests or social disturbances) and internal security. The two systems are administratively separate, although at local levels they co-operate to a large extent and often share resources and internal security bureaus are structured as units or departments within public security bureau's (PSB's) to allow for closer and more effective integrated operations and cooperation as needed.

Most major Chinese cities will have a PSB assigned to deal with local security needs. Each province, municipality and autonomous region (excluding the special administrative regions of Macau and Hong Kong, which have their own police forces, the Hong Kong Police Force and the Public Security Police Force of Macau) has a provincial-level Public Security Department or municipal PSB to deal with provincial security issues.

In 2016, the Xinjiang PSD signed a partnership agreement with Huawei. In 2019, the same PSD and its subordinate municipal PSBs were sanctioned by the U.S. State Department for their role in human rights abuses against the Uyghurs.

In October 2022, various news outlets reported that the MPS had opened clandestine police stations overseas.

Roles and responsibilities 
 Fire Services
 Traffic
 VIP Protection
 Immigration and Visitor Affairs
 Public security
 Crime Control
 Public Safety and Information

See also 

 Ministry of Public Security of the People's Republic of China
 Beijing Municipal Public Security Bureau

References

External links 
 
 Shanghai Municipal Bureau of Public Security
 Guangdong Provincial Public Security Department
 Bureau of Public Security of Guangzhou Municipality

Ministry of Public Security (China)